Breeding is the first EP by American indie band Dirty Little Rabbits. It was released on August 15, 2007, for sale exclusively through the New York-based record shop Looney Tunes.

Track listing
 "Hello" – 4:10
 "Hero Poet" – 3:03
 "I'm So Beautiful" – 3:48

Personnel
 Stella Katsoudas – vocals
 Ty Fyhrie – guitars
 Jeff Karnowski – bass
 Shawn Crahan – drums, photography
 Michael Pfaff – keyboards
 A. Jonathan Ward – assistant producer
 Judy Long – illustration
 Scott Kaven – photography

References

Dirty Little Rabbits albums
2007 debut EPs